Pierre Morel-À-L'Huissier (born December 21, 1958 in Strasbourg) is a member of the National Assembly of France.  He represents the Lozère department, as a member of UMP, then the Republicans, then UDI.
He was deputy for Lozère's 2nd constituency until it was abolished in the 2010 redistricting of French legislative constituencies.  Then from the 2012 election he represented the new constituency for the whole department.

Other activities
 École nationale d'administration (ENA), Alternate Member of the Board of Directors (since 2019)

References

1958 births
Living people
Politicians from Strasbourg
Union for a Popular Movement politicians
The Republicans (France) politicians
The Social Right
Deputies of the 12th National Assembly of the French Fifth Republic
Deputies of the 13th National Assembly of the French Fifth Republic
Deputies of the 14th National Assembly of the French Fifth Republic
Deputies of the 15th National Assembly of the French Fifth Republic
Deputies of the 16th National Assembly of the French Fifth Republic